Leah Curtis is a Los Angeles-based Australian musician and composer. She is best known for her work as composer and orchestrator for film, as well as in contemporary classical composition.

Awards

Curtis has been the recipient of a number of awards include the Queen Elizabeth II Trust, the Dame Joan Sutherland Award, the Reg Waite Award, Young Shakespearean Artist of the Year, a Hollywood Music in Media Award  with multiple nominations and a Fulbright Scholarship.

APRA-AGSC Screen Music Awards
These awards are presented annually since 2002 by the Australasian Performing Right Association (APRA) and the Australian Guild of Screen Composers (AGSC). 
 

|-
|rowspan="1"| 2012 ||Animula Vagula from Exitus Roma Featuring Lisbeth Scott || Best Original Song Composed for the Screen  || 
|-

Hollywood Music in Media Awards
The Hollywood Music in Media Awards are presented annually.
 

|-
|rowspan="1"| 2014 ||No Ticket to Travel for Woodland || Best Original Song/Score for a Commercial Advertisement     || 
|-
|rowspan="1"| 2013 ||Moving Water from Empyrean || Best Original Score (Indie / Short / Documentary)     || 
|-
|rowspan="1"| 2012 ||Animula Vagula from Exitus Roma Featuring Lisbeth Scott || Best World Song  || 
|-
|rowspan="1"| 2012 ||Animula Vagula from Exitus Roma Featuring Lisbeth Scott || Best Original Song (Indie / Short / Documentary) || 
|-
|rowspan="1"| 2010 ||Salamun Salam (Peace of Peace) Featuring Lisbeth Scott || Best World Song || 
|-
|rowspan="1"| 2010 ||To Rest in Peace || Best Original Score (Indie / Short / Documentary) || 
|-
|rowspan="1"| 2009 ||Australia Suite || Best Orchestral / Classical Work || 
|-

The Park City Film Music Festival
The first U.S. (American) film festival dedicated to the impact of music in film, held annually in Park City, Utah. 
 

|-
|rowspan="1"| 2012 ||To Rest in Peace || Best Impact of Music in a Short Film 3rd Place   || 
|-

References

External links
 Leah Curtis: Australian Music Centre Fully Represented Composer Biography
 Leah Curtis American Composers Forum Biography
 
 Australian Academy of Television Arts and Sciences Profile
 Australian Music Centre Feature Article : Leah Curtis 'Be open and take risks"
 Leah Curtis at the National Portrait Gallery

20th-century classical composers
21st-century classical composers
Australian classical composers
Australian women classical composers
Australian film score composers
Australian women film score composers
Living people
Year of birth missing (living people)
20th-century women composers
21st-century women composers
Fulbright alumni